Ashok Chauhan is an Indian industrialist and president of the Amity Education Group. He is also the founder of Ritnand Balved Education Foundation.

Personal life and career
Ashok Chauhan lives in New Delhi. According to his son, Atul, it was in the 1980s that Chauhan thought of entering into the education industry. In the mid-1990s, Chauhan founded Amity, and later in 2005, he founded Amity University.

Awards and recognition
'Excellence in Education Award' from Ramakrishna-Vivekananda International Foundation.
'Lifetime Achievement Award For Higher Education' by Franchise India in 2011.

References

Businesspeople from Delhi
Living people
Year of birth missing (living people)